Gordil Airport  is an airstrip serving Gordil, a village in the Vakaga prefecture of the Central African Republic.

The runway is unusable during the rainy season, and aircraft have to do steep departures and landings in order not to disturb the wildlife in the park. The east end of the runway overruns onto the RN8 road.

See also

Transport in the Central African Republic
List of airports in the Central African Republic

References

External links 
OpenStreetMap - Gordil
OurAirports - Gordil Airport
FallingRain - Gordil Airport

Airports in the Central African Republic
Buildings and structures in Vakaga